Saddam Hussein (28 April 1937 – 30 December 2006), also known mononymously as Saddam, was an Iraqi politician who served as the fifth president of Iraq from 16 July 1979 until 9 April 2003. A leading member of the revolutionary Arab Socialist Ba'ath Party, and later, the Baghdad-based Ba'ath Party and its regional organization, the Iraqi Ba'ath Party—which espoused Ba'athism, a mix of Arab nationalism, Iraqi nationalism and Arab socialism—Saddam played a key role in the 1968 coup (later referred to as the 17 July Revolution) that brought the party to power in Iraq.

As vice president under the ailing General Ahmed Hassan al-Bakr, and at a time when many groups were considered capable of overthrowing the government, Saddam created security forces through which he tightly controlled conflicts between the government and the armed forces. In the early 1970s, Saddam nationalised the Iraq Petroleum Company and independent banks, eventually leaving the banking system insolvent due to inflation and bad loans. Through the 1970s, Saddam consolidated his authority over the apparatus of government as oil money helped Iraq's economy grow rapidly. Positions of power in the country were mostly filled with Sunni Arabs, a minority that made up only a fifth of the population.

Saddam formally took power in 1979, although he had already been the de facto head of Iraq for several years. He suppressed several movements, particularly Shi'a and Kurdish movements which sought to overthrow the government or gain independence, respectively, and maintained power during the Iran–Iraq War and the Gulf War. He ran a repressive authoritarian government, which several analysts have described as totalitarian, although the applicability of that label has been contested. Saddam's rule was marked by numerous human rights abuses, including an estimated 250,000 arbitrary killings and bloody invasions of neighboring Iran and Kuwait.

In 2003, a coalition led by the United States invaded Iraq to depose Saddam. US President George W. Bush and United Kingdom Prime Minister Tony Blair erroneously accused Iraq of possessing weapons of mass destruction and having ties to al-Qaeda. Saddam's Ba'ath party was disbanded. After his capture on 13 December 2003, the trial of Saddam Hussein took place under the Iraqi Interim Government. On 5 November 2006, Saddam was convicted by an Iraqi court of crimes against humanity related to the 1982 killing of 148 Iraqi Shi'a and sentenced to death by hanging. He was executed on 30 December 2006.

Early life and education 

Saddam Hussein was born on 28 April 1937 in Awja, a small village near Tikrit. Saddam's brother and father Abd al-Majid al-Tikriti  both died of cancer before his birth. These deaths made Saddam's mother, Subha Tulfah al-Mussallat, so depressed that she attempted to abort her pregnancy and commit suicide. Subha "would have nothing to do with him," and Saddam would eventually be taken in by an uncle. His mother remarried, and Saddam gained three half-brothers through this marriage. His stepfather, Ibrahim al-Hassan, treated Saddam harshly after his return, and (according to a psychological profile created by the CIA) beat him regularly, sometimes to wake him up. At around the age of 10, Saddam fled the family and returned to live in Baghdad with his uncle Khairallah Talfah, who became a fatherly figure to Saddam. Talfah, the father of Saddam's future wife, was a devout Sunni Muslim and a veteran of the 1941 Anglo-Iraqi War between Iraqi nationalists and the United Kingdom, which remained a major colonial power in the region. Talfah later became the mayor of Baghdad during Saddam's time in power, until his notorious corruption compelled Saddam to force him out of office.

Later in his life, relatives from his native Tikrit became some of his closest advisors and supporters. Under the guidance of his uncle, he attended a nationalistic high school in Baghdad. After secondary school, Saddam studied at an Iraqi law school for three years, dropping out in 1957 at the age of 20 to join the revolutionary pan-Arab Ba'ath Party, of which his uncle was a supporter. During this time, Saddam apparently supported himself as a secondary school teacher. Ba'athist ideology originated in Syria and the Ba'ath Party had a large following in Syria at the time, but in 1955 there were fewer than 300 Ba'ath Party members in Iraq and it is believed that Saddam's primary reason for joining the party as opposed to the more established Iraqi nationalist parties was his familial connection to Ahmed Hassan al-Bakr and other leading Ba'athists through his uncle.

Revolutionary sentiment was characteristic of the era in Iraq and throughout the Middle East. In Iraq progressives and socialists assailed traditional political elites (colonial-era bureaucrats and landowners, wealthy merchants and tribal chiefs, and monarchists). Moreover, the pan-Arab nationalism of Gamal Abdel Nasser in Egypt profoundly influenced young Ba'athists like Saddam. The rise of Nasser foreshadowed a wave of revolutions throughout the Middle East in the 1950s and 1960s, with the collapse of the monarchies of Iraq, Egypt, and Libya. Nasser inspired nationalists throughout the Middle East by fighting the British and the French during the Suez Crisis of 1956, modernizing Egypt, and uniting the Arab world politically. His father-in-law, Khairallah Talfah, was reported to have served five years in prison for his role in fighting against Great Britain in the 1941 Iraqi coup d'état and Anglo-Iraqi War, and often mentored and told tales of his exploits to the young Saddam.

In 1958, a year after Saddam had joined the Ba'ath party, army officers led by General Abd al-Karim Qasim overthrew Faisal II of Iraq in the 14 July Revolution.

Rise to power 

The Ba'ath Party was originally represented in Qasim's cabinet. The party turned against him for his refusal to join Gamal Abdel Nasser's United Arab Republic (UAR). To strengthen his own position within the government, Qasim created an alliance with the Iraqi Communist Party, which was opposed to any notion of pan-Arabism. Later that year, the Ba'ath Party leadership was planning to assassinate Qasim. Saddam was a leading member of the operation. At the time, the Ba'ath Party was more of an ideological experiment than a strong anti-government fighting machine. The majority of its members were either educated professionals or students, and Saddam fit the bill. The choice of Saddam was, according to journalist Con Coughlin, "hardly surprising." The idea of assassinating Qasim may have been Nasser's, and there is speculation that some of those who participated in the operation received training in Damascus, which was then part of the UAR. Per Con Coughlin, "no evidence has ever been produced to implicate Nasser directly in the plot." Saddam himself is not believed to have received any training outside of Iraq, as he was a late addition to the assassination team.

The assassins planned to ambush Qasim at Al-Rashid Street on 7 October 1959: one man was to kill those sitting at the back of the car, the rest killing those in front. During the ambush it is claimed that Saddam began shooting prematurely, which disorganized the whole operation. Qasim's chauffeur was killed, and Qasim was hit in the arm and shoulder. The assassins believed they had killed him and quickly retreated to their headquarters, but Qasim survived. At the time of the attack the Ba'ath Party had fewer than 1,000 members. Saddam's role in the failed assassination became a crucial part of his public image for decades. Kanan Makiya recounts:
The man and the myth merge in this episode. His biography—and Iraqi television, which stages the story ad nauseam—tells of his familiarity with guns from the age of ten; his fearlessness and loyalty to the party during the 1959 operation; his bravery in saving his comrades by commandeering a car at gunpoint; the bullet that was gouged out of his flesh under his direction in hiding; the iron discipline that led him to draw a gun on weaker comrades who would have dropped off a seriously wounded member of the hit team at a hospital; the calculating shrewdness that helped him save himself minutes before the police broke in leaving his wounded comrades behind; and finally the long trek of a wounded man from house to house, city to town, across the desert to refuge in Syria.

Some of the plotters (including Saddam) quickly managed to leave the country for Syria, the spiritual home of Ba'athist ideology. There Saddam was given full membership in the party by Michel Aflaq. Some members of the operation were arrested and taken into custody by the Iraqi government. At the show trial, six of the defendants were given death sentences; for unknown reasons the sentences were not carried out. Aflaq, the leader of the Ba'athist movement, organized the expulsion of leading Iraqi Ba'athist members, such as Fuad al-Rikabi, on the grounds that the party should not have initiated the attempt on Qasim's life. At the same time, Aflaq secured seats in the Iraqi Ba'ath leadership for his supporters, one of them being Saddam. Saddam moved from Syria to Egypt itself in February 1960, and he continued to live there until 1963, graduating from high school in 1961 and unsuccessfully pursuing a law degree at Cairo Law School (1962–1963).

Army officers with ties to the Ba'ath Party overthrew Qasim in the Ramadan Revolution coup of February 1963. Ba'athist leaders were appointed to the cabinet and Abdul Salam Arif became president. Arif dismissed and arrested the Ba'athist leaders later that year in the November 1963 Iraqi coup d'état. Being exiled in Egypt at the time, Saddam played no role in the 1963 coup or the brutal anti-communist purge that followed; although he returned to Iraq after the coup, Saddam remained "on the fringes of the newly installed Ba'thi administration and [had] to content himself with the minor position of a member of the Party's central bureau for peasants," in the words of Efraim Karsh and Inari Rautsi. Unlike during the Qasim years, Saddam remained in Iraq following Arif's anti-Ba'athist purge in November 1963, and became involved in planning to assassinate Arif. In marked contrast to Qasim, Saddam knew that he faced no death penalty from Arif's government and knowingly accepted the risk of being arrested rather than fleeing to Syria again. Saddam was arrested in October 1964 and served approximately two years in prison before escaping in 1966. In 1966, Ahmed Hassan al-Bakr appointed him Deputy Secretary of the Regional Command. Saddam, who would prove to be a skilled organizer, revitalized the party. He was elected to the Regional Command, as the story goes, with help from Michel Aflaq—the founder of Ba'athist thought. In September 1966, Saddam initiated an extraordinary challenge to Syrian domination of the Ba'ath Party in response to the Marxist takeover of the Syrian Ba'ath earlier that year, resulting in the Party's formalized split into two separate factions. Saddam then created a Ba'athist security service, which he alone controlled.

In July 1968, Saddam participated in a bloodless coup led by Ahmed Hassan al-Bakr that overthrew Abdul Rahman Arif, Salam Arif's brother and successor. While Saddam's role in the coup was not hugely significant (except in the official account), Saddam planned and carried out the subsequent purge of the non-Ba'athist faction led by Prime Minister Abd ar-Razzaq an-Naif, whose support had been essential to the coup's success. According to a semi-official biography, Saddam personally led Naif at gunpoint to the plane that escorted him out of Iraq. Arif was given refuge in London and then Istanbul. Al-Bakr was named president and Saddam was named his deputy, and deputy chairman of the Ba'athist Revolutionary Command Council. According to biographers, Saddam never forgot the tensions within the first Ba'athist government, which formed the basis for his measures to promote Ba'ath party unity as well as his resolve to maintain power and programs to ensure social stability. Although Saddam was al-Bakr's deputy, he was a strong behind-the-scenes party politician. Al-Bakr was the older and more prestigious of the two, but by 1969 Saddam clearly had become the moving force behind the party.

Political program 
 In the late 1960s and early 1970s, as vice chairman of the Revolutionary Command Council, formally al-Bakr's second-in-command, Saddam built a reputation as a progressive, effective politician. At this time, Saddam moved up the ranks in the new government by aiding attempts to strengthen and unify the Ba'ath party and taking a leading role in addressing the country's major domestic problems and expanding the party's following.

After the Ba'athists took power in 1968, Saddam focused on attaining stability in a nation riddled with profound tensions. Long before Saddam, Iraq had been split along social, ethnic, religious, and economic fault lines: Sunni versus Shi'ite, Arab versus Kurd, tribal chief versus urban merchant, nomad versus peasant. The desire for stable rule in a country rife with factionalism led Saddam to pursue both massive repression and the improvement of living standards.

Saddam actively fostered the modernization of the Iraqi economy along with the creation of a strong security apparatus to prevent coups within the power structure and insurrections apart from it. Ever concerned with broadening his base of support among the diverse elements of Iraqi society and mobilizing mass support, he closely followed the administration of state welfare and development programs.

At the center of this strategy was Iraq's oil. On 1 June 1972, Saddam oversaw the seizure of international oil interests, which, at the time, dominated the country's oil sector. A year later, world oil prices rose dramatically as a result of the 1973 energy crisis, and skyrocketing revenues enabled Saddam to expand his agenda.

Within just a few years, Iraq was providing social services that were unprecedented among Middle Eastern countries. Saddam established and controlled the "National Campaign for the Eradication of Illiteracy" and the campaign for "Compulsory Free Education in Iraq," and largely under his auspices, the government established universal free schooling up to the highest education levels; hundreds of thousands learned to read in the years following the initiation of the program. The government also supported families of soldiers, granted free hospitalization to everyone, and gave subsidies to farmers. Iraq created one of the most modernized public-health systems in the Middle East, earning Saddam an award from the United Nations Educational, Scientific and Cultural Organization (UNESCO).

With the help of increasing oil revenues, Saddam diversified the largely oil-based Iraqi economy. Saddam implemented a national infrastructure campaign that made great progress in building roads, promoting mining, and developing other industries. The campaign helped Iraq's energy industries. Electricity was brought to nearly every city in Iraq, and many outlying areas. Before the 1970s, most of Iraq's people lived in the countryside and roughly two-thirds were peasants. This number would decrease quickly during the 1970s as global oil prices helped revenues to rise from less than a half billion dollars to tens of billions of dollars and the country invested into industrial expansion.

The oil revenue benefited Saddam politically. According to The Economist, "Much as Adolf Hitler won early praise for galvanizing German industry, ending mass unemployment and building autobahns, Saddam earned admiration abroad for his deeds. He had a good instinct for what the "Arab street" demanded, following the decline in Egyptian leadership brought about by the trauma of Israel's six-day victory in the 1967 war, the death of the pan-Arabist hero, Gamal Abdul Nasser, in 1970, and the "traitorous" drive by his successor, Anwar Sadat, to sue for peace with the Jewish state. Saddam's self-aggrandizing propaganda, with himself posing as the defender of Arabism against Jewish or Persian intruders, was heavy-handed, but consistent as a drumbeat. It helped, of course, that his mukhabarat (secret police) put dozens of Arab news editors, writers and artists on the payroll."

In 1972, Saddam signed a 15-year Treaty of Friendship and Cooperation with the Soviet Union. According to historian Charles R. H. Tripp, the treaty upset "the US-sponsored security system established as part of the Cold War in the Middle East. It appeared that any enemy of the Baghdad regime was a potential ally of the United States." In response, the US covertly financed Kurdish rebels led by Mustafa Barzani during the Second Iraqi–Kurdish War; the Kurds were defeated in 1975, leading to the forcible relocation of hundreds of thousands of Kurdish civilians.

Saddam focused on fostering loyalty to the Ba'athists in the rural areas. After nationalizing foreign oil interests, Saddam supervised the modernization of the countryside, mechanizing agriculture on a large scale, and distributing land to peasant farmers. The Ba'athists established farm cooperatives and the government also doubled expenditures for agricultural development in 1974–1975. Saddam's welfare programs were part of a combination of "carrot and stick" tactics to enhance support for Saddam. The state-owned banks were put under his thumb. Lending was based on cronyism. Development went forward at such a fevered pitch that two million people from other Arab countries and even Yugoslavia worked in Iraq to meet the growing demand for labor.

Succession 
In 1976, Saddam rose to the position of general in the Iraqi armed forces, and rapidly became the strongman of the government. As the ailing, elderly al-Bakr became unable to execute his duties, Saddam took on an increasingly prominent role as the face of the government both internally and externally. He soon became the architect of Iraq's foreign policy and represented the nation in all diplomatic situations. He was the de facto leader of Iraq some years before he formally came to power in 1979. He slowly began to consolidate his power over Iraq's government and the Ba'ath party. Relationships with fellow party members were carefully cultivated, and Saddam soon accumulated a powerful circle of support within the party.

In 1979, al-Bakr started to make treaties with Syria, also under Ba'athist leadership, that would lead to unification between the two countries. Syrian President Hafez al-Assad would become deputy leader in a union, and this would drive Saddam to obscurity. Saddam acted to secure his grip on power. He forced the ailing al-Bakr to resign on 16 July 1979, and formally assumed the presidency.

1979 Ba'ath Party Purge 

Saddam convened an assembly of Ba'ath party leaders on 22 July 1979. During the assembly, which he ordered videotaped, Saddam claimed to have found a fifth column within the Ba'ath Party and directed Muhyi Abdel-Hussein to read out a confession and the names of 68 alleged co-conspirators. These members were labelled "disloyal" and were removed from the room one by one and taken into custody. After the list was read, Saddam congratulated those still seated in the room for their past and future loyalty. The 68 people arrested at the meeting were subsequently tried together and found guilty of treason; 22 were sentenced to execution. Other high-ranking members of the party formed the firing squad. By 1 August 1979, hundreds of high-ranking Ba'ath party members had been executed.

Paramilitary and police organizations 

Iraqi society fissures along lines of language, religion and ethnicity. The Ba'ath Party, secular by nature, adopted Pan-Arab ideologies which in turn were problematic for significant parts of the population. Following the Iranian Revolution of 1979, Iraq faced the prospect of régime change from two Shi'ite factions (Dawa and SCIRI) which aspired to model Iraq on its neighbour Iran as a Shia theocracy. A separate threat to Iraq came from parts of the ethnic Kurdish population of northern Iraq which opposed being part of an Iraqi state and favored independence (an ongoing ideology which had preceded Ba'ath Party rule). To alleviate the threat of revolution, Saddam afforded certain benefits to the potentially hostile population. Membership in the Ba'ath Party remained open to all Iraqi citizens regardless of background, and repressive measures were taken against its opponents.

The major instruments for accomplishing this control were the paramilitary and police organizations. Beginning in 1974, Taha Yassin Ramadan (himself a Kurdish Ba'athist), a close associate of Saddam, commanded the People's Army, which had responsibility for internal security. As the Ba'ath Party's paramilitary, the People's Army acted as a counterweight against any coup attempts by the regular armed forces. In addition to the People's Army, the Department of General Intelligence was the most notorious arm of the state-security system, feared for its use of torture and assassination. Barzan Ibrahim al-Tikriti, Saddam's younger half-brother, commanded Mukhabarat. Foreign observers believed that from 1982 this department operated both at home and abroad in its mission to seek out and eliminate Saddam's perceived opponents.

Saddam was notable for using terror against his own people. The Economist described Saddam as "one of the last of the 20th century's great dictators, but not the least in terms of egotism, or cruelty, or morbid will to power." Saddam's regime brought about the deaths of at least 250,000 Iraqis and committed war crimes in Iran, Kuwait, and Saudi Arabia. Human Rights Watch and Amnesty International issued regular reports of widespread imprisonment and torture. Conversely, Saddam used Iraq's oil wealth to develop an extensive patronage system for the regime's supporters.

Although Saddam is often described as a totalitarian leader, Joseph Sassoon notes that there are important differences between Saddam's repression and the totalitarianism practiced by Adolf Hitler and Joseph Stalin, particularly with regard to freedom of movement and freedom of religion.

Political and cultural image 

During his leadership, Saddam promoted the idea of dual nationalism which combines Iraqi nationalism and Arab nationalism, a much broader form of ethnic nationalism which supports Iraqi nationalism and links it to matters that impact Arabs as a whole. Saddam Hussein believed that the recognition of the ancient Mesopotamian origins and heritage of Iraqi Arabs was complementary to supporting Arab nationalism.

In the course of his reign, the Ba'athist regime officially included the historic Kurdish Muslim leader Saladin as a patriotic symbol in Iraq, while Saddam called himself son of the Babylonian King Nebuchadnezzar and had stamped the bricks of ancient Babylon with his name and titles next to him.
As a sign of his consolidation of power, Saddam's personality cult pervaded Iraqi society. He had thousands of portraits, posters, statues and murals erected in his honor all over Iraq. His face could be seen on the sides of office buildings, schools, airports, and shops, as well as on Iraqi currency.

Saddam's personality cult reflected his efforts to appeal to the various elements in Iraqi society. This was seen in his variety of apparel: when visited villages, he appeared in the costumes of the Arabs, a thawb which the traditional clothes of the Arab peasant (which he essentially wore during his childhood in his village), and even Kurdish clothing, but also appeared in Western suits fitted by his favorite tailor and hat, projecting the image of a powerful leader. Sometimes he would also be portrayed as a devout Muslim, wearing full headdress and robe, praying toward Mecca.

He also conducted two show elections, in 1995 and 2002. In the 1995 referendum, conducted on 15 October, he reportedly received 99.96% of the votes in a 99.47% turnout, getting only 3,052 negative votes among an electorate of 8.4 million.

In the 15 October 2002 referendum he officially achieved 100% of approval votes and 100% turnout, as the electoral commission reported the next day that every one of the 11,445,638 eligible voters cast a "Yes" vote for the president.

He erected statues around the country, which Iraqis toppled after his fall.

Foreign affairs 

Iraq's relations with the Arab world have been extremely varied. Relations between Iraq and Egypt violently ruptured in 1977, when the two nations broke relations with each other following Iraq's criticism of Egyptian President Anwar Sadat's peace initiatives with Israel. In 1978, Baghdad hosted an Arab League summit that condemned and ostracized Egypt for accepting the Camp David Accords. Egypt's strong material and diplomatic support for Iraq in the war with Iran led to warmer relations and numerous contacts between senior officials, despite the continued absence of ambassadorial-level representation. Since 1983, Iraq has repeatedly called for restoration of Egypt's "natural role" among Arab countries.

Saddam developed a reputation for liking expensive goods, such as his diamond-coated Rolex wristwatch, and sent copies of them to his friends around the world. To his ally Kenneth Kaunda Saddam once sent a Boeing 747 full of presents—rugs, televisions, ornaments.

Saddam enjoyed a close relationship with Russian intelligence agent Yevgeny Primakov that dated back to the 1960s; Primakov may have helped Saddam to stay in power in 1991.

Saddam visited only two Western countries. The first visit took place in December 1974, when the Caudillo of Spain, Francisco Franco, invited him to Madrid and he visited Granada, Córdoba and Toledo. In September 1975 he met with Prime Minister Jacques Chirac in Paris, France.

Several Iraqi leaders, Lebanese arms merchant Sarkis Soghanalian and others have claimed that Saddam financed Chirac's party. In 1991 Saddam threatened to expose those who had taken largesse from him: "From Mr. Chirac to Mr. Chevènement, politicians and economic leaders were in open competition to spend time with us and flatter us. We have now grasped the reality of the situation. If the trickery continues, we will be forced to unmask them, all of them, before the French public." France armed Saddam and it was Iraq's largest trade partner throughout Saddam's rule. Seized documents show how French officials and businessmen close to Chirac, including Charles Pasqua, his former interior minister, personally benefitted from the deals with Saddam.

Because Saddam Hussein rarely left Iraq, Tariq Aziz, one of Saddam's aides, traveled abroad extensively and represented Iraq at many diplomatic meetings. In foreign affairs, Saddam sought to have Iraq play a leading role in the Middle East. Iraq signed an aid pact with the Soviet Union in 1972, and arms were sent along with several thousand advisers. The 1978 crackdown on Iraqi Communists and a shift of trade toward the West strained Iraqi relations with the Soviet Union; Iraq then took on a more Western orientation until the Gulf War in 1991.

After the oil crisis of 1973, France had changed to a more pro-Arab policy and was accordingly rewarded by Saddam with closer ties. He made a state visit to France in 1975, cementing close ties with some French business and ruling political circles. In 1975 Saddam negotiated an accord with Iran that contained Iraqi concessions on border disputes. In return, Iran agreed to stop supporting opposition Kurds in Iraq. Saddam led Arab opposition to the Camp David Accords between Egypt and Israel (1979).

Saddam initiated Iraq's nuclear enrichment project in the 1980s, with French assistance. The first Iraqi nuclear reactor was named by the French "Osirak". Osirak was destroyed on 7 June 1981 by an Israeli air strike (Operation Opera).

Nearly from its founding as a modern state in 1920, Iraq has had to deal with Kurdish separatists in the northern part of the country. Saddam did negotiate an agreement in 1970 with separatist Kurdish leaders, giving them autonomy, but the agreement broke down. The result was brutal fighting between the government and Kurdish groups and Iraqi bombing of Kurdish villages in Iran, which caused Iraqi relations with Iran to deteriorate. After Saddam negotiated the 1975 treaty with Iran, the Shah withdrew support for the Kurds, who were defeated.

Iran–Iraq War 

In early 1979, Iran's Shah Mohammad Reza Pahlavi was overthrown by the Islamic Revolution, thus giving way to an Islamic republic led by the Ayatollah Ruhollah Khomeini. The influence of revolutionary Shi'ite Islam grew apace in the region, particularly in countries with large Shi'ite populations, especially Iraq. Saddam feared that radical Islamic ideas—hostile to his secular rule—were rapidly spreading inside his country among the majority Shi'ite population.

There had also been bitter enmity between Saddam and Khomeini since the 1970s. Khomeini, having been exiled from Iran in 1964, took up residence in Iraq, at the Shi'ite holy city of An Najaf. There he involved himself with Iraqi Shi'ites and developed a strong, worldwide religious and political following against the Iranian Government, which Saddam tolerated. When Khomeini began to urge the Shi'ites there to overthrow Saddam and under pressure from the Shah, who had agreed to a rapprochement between Iraq and Iran in 1975, Saddam agreed to expel Khomeini in 1978 to France. Here, Khomeini gained media connections and collaborated with a much larger Iranian community, to his advantage.

After Khomeini gained power, skirmishes between Iraq and revolutionary Iran occurred for ten months over the sovereignty of the disputed Shatt al-Arab waterway, which divides the two countries. During this period, Saddam Hussein publicly maintained that it was in Iraq's interest not to engage with Iran, and that it was in the interests of both nations to maintain peaceful relations.  In a private meeting with Salah Omar al-Ali, Iraq's permanent ambassador to the United Nations, he revealed that he intended to invade and occupy a large part of Iran within months. Later (probably to appeal for support from the US and most Western nations), he would make toppling the Islamic government one of his intentions as well.

Iraq invaded Iran, first attacking Mehrabad Airport of Tehran and then entering the oil-rich Iranian land of Khuzestan, which also has a sizable Arab minority, on 22 September 1980 and declared it a new province of Iraq. With the support of the Arab states, the US, and Europe, and heavily financed by the Arab states of the Persian Gulf, Saddam Hussein had become "the defender of the Arab world" against a revolutionary Iran. The only exception was the Soviet Union, who initially refused to supply Iraq on the basis of neutrality in the conflict, although in his memoirs, Mikhail Gorbachev claimed that Leonid Brezhnev refused to aid Saddam over infuriation of Saddam's treatment of Iraqi communists. Consequently, many viewed Iraq as "an agent of the civilized world." The blatant disregard of international law and violations of international borders were ignored. Instead Iraq received economic and military support from its allies, who overlooked Saddam's use of chemical warfare against the Kurds and the Iranians, in addition to Iraq's efforts to develop nuclear weapons.

In the first days of the war, there was heavy ground fighting around strategic ports as Iraq launched an attack on Khuzestan. After making some initial gains, Iraq's troops began to suffer losses from human wave attacks by Iran. By 1982, Iraq was on the defensive and looking for ways to end the war.

At this point, Saddam asked his ministers for candid advice. Health Minister Dr. Riyadh Ibrahim suggested that Saddam temporarily step down to promote peace negotiations. Initially, Saddam Hussein appeared to take in this opinion as part of his cabinet democracy. A few weeks later, Dr. Ibrahim was sacked when held responsible for a fatal incident in an Iraqi hospital where a patient died from intravenous administration of the wrong concentration of potassium supplement.

Dr. Ibrahim was arrested a few days after his removal from the cabinet. He was known to have publicly declared before that arrest that he was "glad that he got away alive." Pieces of Ibrahim's dismembered body were delivered to his wife the next day.Iraq quickly found itself bogged down in one of the longest and most destructive wars of attrition of the 20th century. During the war, Iraq used chemical weapons against Iranian forces fighting on the southern front and Kurdish separatists who were attempting to open up a northern front in Iraq with the help of Iran. These chemical weapons were developed by Iraq from materials and technology supplied primarily by West German companies as well as using dual-use technology imported following the Reagan administration's lifting of export restrictions. The US government also supplied Iraq with "satellite photos showing Iranian deployments." In a US bid to open full diplomatic relations with Iraq, the country was removed from the US list of State Sponsors of Terrorism. Ostensibly, this was because of improvement in the regime's record, although former US Assistant Secretary of Defense Noel Koch later stated, "No one had any doubts about [the Iraqis'] continued involvement in terrorism ... The real reason was to help them succeed in the war against Iran." The Soviet Union, France, and China together accounted for over 90% of the value of Iraq's arms imports between 1980 and 1988.

Saddam reached out to other Arab governments for cash and political support during the war, particularly after Iraq's oil industry severely suffered at the hands of the Iranian navy in the Persian Gulf. Iraq successfully gained some military and financial aid, as well as diplomatic and moral support, from the Soviet Union, China, France, and the US, which together feared the prospects of the expansion of revolutionary Iran's influence in the region. The Iranians, demanding that the international community should force Iraq to pay war reparations to Iran, refused any suggestions for a cease-fire. Despite several calls for a ceasefire by the United Nations Security Council, hostilities continued until 20 August 1988.

On 16 March 1988, the Kurdish town of Halabja was attacked with a mix of mustard gas and nerve agents, killing 5,000 civilians, and maiming, disfiguring, or seriously debilitating 10,000 more. (see Halabja massacre) The attack occurred in conjunction with the 1988 al-Anfal Campaign designed to reassert central control of the mostly Kurdish population of areas of northern Iraq and defeat the Kurdish peshmerga rebel forces. Claims by Saddam's government and its international supporters that Iran had actually gassed the Kurds at Halabja have been thoroughly debunked.

The bloody eight-year war ended in a stalemate. Encyclopædia Britannica states: "Estimates of total casualties range from 1,000,000 to twice that number. The number killed on both sides was perhaps 500,000, with Iran suffering the greatest losses." Neither side had achieved what they had originally desired and the borders were left nearly unchanged. The southern, oil rich and prosperous Khuzestan and Basra area (the main focus of the war, and the primary source of their economies) were almost completely destroyed and were left at the pre-1979 border, while Iran managed to make some small gains on its borders in the Northern Kurdish area. Both economies, previously healthy and expanding, were left in ruins.

Saddam borrowed tens of billions of dollars from other Arab states and a few billions from elsewhere during the 1980s to fight Iran, mainly to prevent the expansion of Shi'a radicalism. This backfired on Iraq and the Arab states, for Khomeini was widely perceived as a hero for managing to defend Iran and maintain the war with little foreign support against the heavily backed Iraq and only managed to boost Islamic radicalism not only within the Arab states, but within Iraq itself, creating new tensions between the Sunni Ba'ath Party and the majority Shi'a population. Faced with rebuilding Iraq's infrastructure and internal resistance, Saddam desperately re-sought cash, this time for postwar reconstruction.

Al-Anfal Campaign 

The Al-Anfal Campaign was a genocidal campaign against the Kurdish people (and many others) in Kurdish regions of Iraq led by the government of Saddam Hussein and headed by Ali Hassan al-Majid. The campaign takes its name from  Qur'anic chapter 8 (al-ʾanfāl), which was used as a code name by the former Iraqi Ba'athist administration for a series of attacks against the peshmerga rebels and the mostly Kurdish civilian population of rural Northern Iraq, conducted between 1986 and 1989 culminating in 1988. This campaign also targeted Shabaks and Yazidis, Assyrians, Turkoman people and Mandaeans and many villages belonging to these ethnic groups were also destroyed. Human Rights Watch estimates that between 50,000 and 100,000 people were killed. Some Kurdish sources put the number higher, estimating that 182,000 Kurds were killed.

Tensions with Kuwait 

The end of the war with Iran served to deepen latent tensions between Iraq and its wealthy neighbor Kuwait. Saddam urged the Kuwaitis to waive the Iraqi debt accumulated in the war, some $30 billion, but they refused. Saddam pushed oil-exporting countries to raise oil prices by cutting back production; Kuwait refused, then led the opposition in OPEC to the cuts that Saddam had requested. Kuwait was pumping large amounts of oil, and thus keeping prices low, when Iraq needed to sell high-priced oil from its wells to pay off its huge debt.

Saddam had consistently argued that Kuwait had historically been an integral part of Iraq, and had only come into being as a result of interference from the British government; echoing a belief that Iraqi nationalists had supported for the past fifty years. This belief was one of the few articles of faith uniting the political scene in a nation rife with sharp social, ethnic, religious, and ideological divides. The extent of Kuwaiti oil reserves also intensified tensions in the region. The oil reserves of Kuwait (with a population of 2 million next to Iraq's 25) were roughly equal to those of Iraq. Taken together, Iraq and Kuwait sat on top of some 20 percent of the world's known oil reserves; Saudi Arabia held another 25 percent. Saddam still had an experienced and well-equipped army, which he used to influence regional affairs. He later ordered troops to the Iraq–Kuwait border.

As Iraq–Kuwait relations rapidly deteriorated, Saddam was receiving conflicting information about how the US would respond to the prospects of an invasion. For one, Washington had been taking measures to cultivate a constructive relationship with Iraq for roughly a decade. The Reagan administration gave Iraq roughly $4 billion in agricultural credits to bolster it against Iran. Saddam's Iraq became "the third-largest recipient of US assistance."

Reacting to Western criticism in April 1990, Saddam threatened to destroy half of Israel with chemical weapons if it moved against Iraq. In May 1990 he criticized US support for Israel warning that "the US cannot maintain such a policy while professing friendship towards the Arabs." In July 1990 he threatened force against Kuwait and the UAE saying "The policies of some Arab rulers are American ... They are inspired by America to undermine Arab interests and security." The US sent warplanes and combat ships to the Persian Gulf in response to these threats.

The US ambassador to Iraq, April Glaspie, met with Saddam in an emergency meeting on 25 July 1990, where the Iraqi leader attacked American policy with regards to Kuwait and the United Arab Emirates (UAE): 

So what can it mean when America says it will now protect its friends? It can only mean prejudice against Iraq. This stance plus maneuvers and statements which have been made has encouraged the UAE and Kuwait to disregard Iraqi rights. If you use pressure, we will deploy pressure and force. We know that you can harm us although we do not threaten you. But we too can harm you. Everyone can cause harm according to their ability and their size. We cannot come all the way to you in the US, but individual Arabs may reach you. We do not place America among the enemies. We place it where we want our friends to be and we try to be friends. But repeated American statements last year made it apparent that America did not regard us as friends.

Glaspie replied:

I know you need funds. We understand that and our opinion is that you should have the opportunity to rebuild your country. But we have no opinion on the Arab-Arab conflicts, like your border disagreement with Kuwait. ... Frankly, we can only see that you have deployed massive troops in the south. Normally that would not be any of our business. But when this happens in the context of what you said on your national day, then when we read the details in the two letters of the Foreign Minister, then when we see the Iraqi point of view that the measures taken by the UAE and Kuwait is, in the final analysis, parallel to military aggression against Iraq, then it would be reasonable for me to be concerned.

Saddam stated that he would attempt last-ditch negotiations with the Kuwaitis but Iraq "would not accept death."

US officials attempted to maintain a conciliatory line with Iraq, indicating that while George H. W. Bush and James Baker did not want force used, they would not take any position on the Iraq–Kuwait boundary dispute and did not want to become involved.

Later, Iraq and Kuwait met for a final negotiation session, which failed. Saddam then sent his troops into Kuwait. As tensions between Washington and Saddam began to escalate, the Soviet Union, under Mikhail Gorbachev, strengthened its military relationship with the Iraqi leader, providing him military advisers, arms and aid.

Gulf War 

On 2 August 1990, Saddam invaded Kuwait, initially claiming assistance to "Kuwaiti revolutionaries," thus sparking an international crisis. On 4 August an Iraqi-backed "Provisional Government of Free Kuwait" was proclaimed, but a total lack of legitimacy and support for it led to an 8 August announcement of a "merger" of the two countries. On 28 August Kuwait formally became the 19th Governorate of Iraq. Just two years after the 1988 Iraq and Iran truce, "Saddam Hussein did what his Gulf patrons had earlier paid him to prevent." Having removed the threat of Iranian fundamentalism he "overran Kuwait and confronted his Gulf neighbors in the name of Arab nationalism and Islam."

When later asked why he invaded Kuwait, Saddam first claimed that it was because Kuwait was rightfully Iraq's 19th province and then said "When I get something into my head I act. That's just the way I am." Saddam Hussein could pursue such military aggression with a "military machine paid for in large part by the tens of billions of dollars Kuwait and the Gulf states had poured into Iraq and the weapons and technology provided by the Soviet Union, Germany, and France." It was revealed during his 2003-2004 interrogation that in addition to economic disputes, an insulting exchange between the Kuwaiti emir Al Sabah and the Iraqi foreign minister - during which Saddam claimed that the emir stated his intention to turn "every Iraqi woman into a $10 prostitute" by ruining Iraq financially - was a decisive factor in triggering the Iraqi invasion.

Shortly before he invaded Kuwait, he shipped 100 new Mercedes 200 Series cars to top editors in Egypt and Jordan. Two days before the first attacks, Saddam reportedly offered Egypt's Hosni Mubarak 50 million dollars in cash, "ostensibly for grain."

US President George H. W. Bush responded cautiously for the first several days. On one hand, Kuwait, prior to this point, had been a virulent enemy of Israel and was the Persian Gulf monarchy that had the most friendly relations with the Soviets. On the other hand, Washington foreign policymakers, along with Middle East experts, military critics, and firms heavily invested in the region, were extremely concerned with stability in this region. The invasion immediately triggered fears that the world's price of oil, and therefore control of the world economy, was at stake. Britain profited heavily from billions of dollars of Kuwaiti investments and bank deposits. Bush was perhaps swayed while meeting with British prime minister Margaret Thatcher, who happened to be in the US at the time.

Cooperation between the US and the Soviet Union made possible the passage of resolutions in the United Nations Security Council (UNSC) giving Iraq a deadline to leave Kuwait and approving the use of force if Saddam did not comply with the timetable. US officials feared Iraqi retaliation against oil-rich Saudi Arabia, since the 1940s a close ally of Washington, for the Saudis' opposition to the invasion of Kuwait. Accordingly, the US and a group of allies, including countries as diverse as Egypt, Syria and Czechoslovakia, deployed a massive number of troops along the Saudi border with Kuwait and Iraq in order to encircle the Iraqi army, the largest in the Middle East.

Saddam's officers looted Kuwait, stripping even the marble from its palaces to move it to Saddam's own palace.

During the period of negotiations and threats following the invasion, Saddam focused renewed attention on the Palestinian problem by promising to withdraw his forces from Kuwait if Israel would relinquish the occupied territories in the West Bank, the Golan Heights, and the Gaza Strip. Saddam's proposal further split the Arab world, pitting US- and Western-supported Arab states against the Palestinians. The allies ultimately rejected any linkage between the Kuwait crisis and Palestinian issues.

Saddam ignored the Security Council deadline. Backed by the Security Council, a US-led coalition launched round-the-clock missile and aerial attacks on Iraq, beginning 16 January 1991. Israel, though subjected to attack by Iraqi missiles, refrained from retaliating in order not to provoke Arab states into leaving the coalition. A ground force consisting largely of US and British armored and infantry divisions ejected Saddam's army from Kuwait in February 1991 and occupied the southern portion of Iraq as far as the Euphrates.

On 6 March 1991, Bush announced "What is at stake is more than one small country, it is a big idea—a new world order, where diverse nations are drawn together in common cause to achieve the universal aspirations of mankind: peace and security, freedom, and the rule of law."

In the end, the Iraqi army proved unable to compete on the battlefield with the highly mobile coalition land forces and their overpowering air support. Some 175,000 Iraqis were taken prisoner and casualties were estimated at over 85,000. As part of the cease-fire agreement, Iraq agreed to scrap all poison gas and germ weapons and allow UN observers to inspect the sites. UN trade sanctions would remain in effect until Iraq complied with all terms. Saddam publicly claimed victory at the end of the war.

1990s 

Iraq's ethnic and religious divisions, together with the brutality of the conflict that this had engendered, laid the groundwork for postwar rebellions. In the aftermath of the fighting, social and ethnic unrest among Shi'ite Muslims, Kurds, and dissident military units threatened the stability of Saddam's government. Uprisings erupted in the Kurdish north and Shi'a southern and central parts of Iraq, but were ruthlessly repressed. Uprisings in 1991 led to the death of 100,000–180,000 people, mostly civilians.

The US, which had urged Iraqis to rise up against Saddam, did nothing to assist the rebellions. The Iranians, despite the widespread Shi'ite rebellions, had no interest in provoking another war, while Turkey opposed any prospect of Kurdish independence, and the Saudis and other conservative Arab states feared an Iran-style Shi'ite revolution. Saddam, having survived the immediate crisis in the wake of defeat, was left firmly in control of Iraq, although the country never recovered either economically or militarily from the Gulf War.

Saddam routinely cited his survival as "proof" that Iraq had in fact won the war against the US. This message earned Saddam a great deal of popularity in many sectors of the Arab world. John Esposito wrote, "Arabs and Muslims were pulled in two directions. That they rallied not so much to Saddam Hussein as to the bipolar nature of the confrontation (the West versus the Arab Muslim world) and the issues that Saddam proclaimed: Arab unity, self-sufficiency, and social justice." As a result, Saddam Hussein appealed to many people for the same reasons that attracted more and more followers to Islamic revivalism and also for the same reasons that fueled anti-Western feelings.

One US Muslim observer noted: "People forgot about Saddam's record and concentrated on America ... Saddam Hussein might be wrong, but it is not America who should correct him." A shift was, therefore, clearly visible among many Islamic movements in the post war period "from an initial Islamic ideological rejection of Saddam Hussein, the secular persecutor of Islamic movements, and his invasion of Kuwait to a more populist Arab nationalist, anti-imperialist support for Saddam (or more precisely those issues he represented or championed) and the condemnation of foreign intervention and occupation."

Saddam, therefore, increasingly portrayed himself as a devout Muslim, in an effort to co-opt the conservative religious segments of society. Some elements of Sharia law were re-introduced, and the ritual phrase "Allahu Akbar" ("God is great"), in Saddam's handwriting, was added to the national flag. Saddam also commissioned the production of a "Blood Qur'an," written using 27 litres of his own blood, to thank God for saving him from various dangers and conspiracies.

The United Nations-placed sanctions against Iraq for invading Kuwait were not lifted, blocking Iraqi oil exports. During the late 1990s, the UN considered relaxing the sanctions imposed because of the hardships suffered by ordinary Iraqis. Studies dispute the number of people who died in south and central Iraq during the years of the sanctions. On 9 December 1996, Saddam's government accepted the Oil-for-Food Programme that the UN had first offered in 1992.

Relations between the US and Iraq remained tense following the Gulf War. The US launched a missile attack aimed at Iraq's intelligence headquarters in Baghdad 26 June 1993, citing evidence of repeated Iraqi violations of the "no fly zones" imposed after the Gulf War and for incursions into Kuwait. US officials continued to accuse Saddam of violating the terms of the Gulf War's cease fire, by developing weapons of mass destruction and other banned weaponry, and violating the UN-imposed sanctions. Also during the 1990s, President Bill Clinton maintained sanctions and ordered air strikes in the "Iraqi no-fly zones" (Operation Desert Fox), in the hope that Saddam would be overthrown by political enemies inside Iraq. Western charges of Iraqi resistance to UN access to suspected weapons were the pretext for crises between 1997 and 1998, culminating in intensive US and British missile strikes on Iraq, 16–19 December 1998. After two years of intermittent activity, US and British warplanes struck harder at sites near Baghdad in February 2001. Former CIA case officer Robert Baer reports that he "tried to assassinate" Saddam in 1995, amid "a decade-long effort to encourage a military coup in Iraq."

Saddam continued involvement in politics abroad. Video tapes retrieved after show his intelligence chiefs meeting with Arab journalists, including a meeting with the former managing director of Al-Jazeera, Mohammed Jassem al-Ali, in 2000. In the video Saddam's son Uday advised al-Ali about hires in Al-Jazeera: "During your last visit here along with your colleagues we talked about a number of issues, and it does appear that you indeed were listening to what I was saying since changes took place and new faces came on board such as that lad, Mansour." He was later sacked by Al-Jazeera.

2002 
In 2002, Austrian prosecutors investigated Saddam government's transactions with Fritz Edlinger that possibly violated Austrian money laundering and embargo regulations. Fritz Edlinger, president of the General Secretary of the Society for Austro-Arab relations (GÖAB) and a former member of Socialist International's Middle East Committee, was an outspoken supporter of Saddam Hussein. In 2005, an Austrian journalist revealed that Fritz Edlinger's GÖAB had received $100,000 from an Iraqi front company as well as donations from Austrian companies soliciting business in Iraq.

In 2002, a resolution sponsored by the European Union was adopted by the Commission for Human Rights, which stated that there had been no improvement in the human rights crisis in Iraq. The statement condemned President Saddam Hussein's government for its "systematic, widespread and extremely grave violations of human rights and international humanitarian law." The resolution demanded that Iraq immediately put an end to its "summary and arbitrary executions ... the use of rape as a political tool and all enforced and involuntary disappearances."

2003 invasion of Iraq 

Many members of the international community, especially the US, continued to view Saddam as a bellicose tyrant who was a threat to the stability of the region. In his January 2002 state of the union address to Congress, President George W. Bush spoke of an "axis of evil" consisting of Iran, North Korea, and Iraq. Moreover, Bush announced that he would possibly take action to topple the Iraqi government, because of the threat of its weapons of mass destruction. Bush stated that "The Iraqi regime has plotted to develop anthrax, and nerve gas, and nuclear weapons for over a decade ... Iraq continues to flaunt its hostility toward America and to support terror."

After the passing of UNSC Resolution 1441, which demanded that Iraq give "immediate, unconditional and active cooperation" with UN and IAEA inspections, Saddam allowed U.N. weapons inspectors led by Hans Blix to return to Iraq. During the renewed inspections beginning in November 2002, Blix found no stockpiles of WMD and noted the "proactive" but not always "immediate" Iraqi cooperation as called for by Resolution 1441.

With war still looming on 24 February 2003, Saddam Hussein took part in an interview with CBS News reporter Dan Rather. Talking for more than three hours, he denied possessing any weapons of mass destruction, or any other weapons prohibited by UN guidelines. He also expressed a wish to have a live televised debate with George W. Bush, which was declined. It was his first interview with a US reporter in over a decade. CBS aired the taped interview later that week. Saddam Hussein later told an FBI interviewer that he once left open the possibility that Iraq possessed weapons of mass destruction in order to appear strong against Iran.

The Iraqi government and military collapsed within three weeks of the beginning of the US-led 2003 invasion of Iraq on 20 March. By the beginning of April, US-led forces occupied much of Iraq. The resistance of the much-weakened Iraqi Army either crumbled or shifted to guerrilla tactics, and it appeared that Saddam had lost control of Iraq. He was last seen in a video which purported to show him in the Baghdad suburbs surrounded by supporters. When Baghdad fell to US-led forces on 9 April, marked symbolically by the toppling of his statue, Saddam was nowhere to be found.

Capture and interrogation 

In April 2003, Saddam's whereabouts remained in question during the weeks following the fall of Baghdad and the conclusion of the major fighting of the war. Various sightings of Saddam were reported in the weeks following the war, but none was authenticated. At various times Saddam released audio tapes promoting popular resistance to his ousting.

Saddam was placed at the top of the "US list of most-wanted Iraqis." In July 2003, his sons Uday and Qusay and 14-year-old grandson Mustapha were killed in a three-hour gunfight with US forces.

On 13 December 2003, in Operation Red Dawn, Saddam was captured by American forces after being found hiding in a hole in the ground near a farmhouse in ad-Dawr, near Tikrit. Following his capture, Saddam was transported to a US base near Tikrit, and later taken to the American base near Baghdad. Documents obtained and released by the National Security Archive detail FBI interviews and conversations with Saddam while he was in US custody. On 14 December, US administrator in Iraq Paul Bremer confirmed that Saddam Hussein had indeed been captured at a farmhouse in ad-Dawr near Tikrit. Bremer presented video footage of Saddam in custody.

Saddam was shown with a full beard and hair longer than his familiar appearance. He was described by US officials as being in good health. Bremer reported plans to put Saddam on trial, but claimed that the details of such a trial had not yet been determined. Iraqis and Americans who spoke with Saddam after his capture generally reported that he remained self-assured, describing himself as a "firm, but just leader."

British tabloid newspaper The Sun posted a picture of Saddam wearing white briefs on the front cover of a newspaper. Other photographs inside the paper show Saddam washing his trousers, shuffling, and sleeping. The US government stated that it considered the release of the pictures a violation of the Geneva Convention, and that it would investigate the photographs. During this period Saddam was interrogated by FBI agent George Piro.

The guards at the Baghdad detention facility called their prisoner "Vic," which stands for 'Very Important Criminal', and let him plant a small garden near his cell. The nickname and the garden are among the details about the former Iraqi leader that emerged during a March 2008 tour of the Baghdad prison and cell where Saddam slept, bathed, and kept a journal and wrote poetry in the final days before his execution; he was concerned to ensure his legacy and how the history would be told. The tour was conducted by US Marine Maj. Gen. Doug Stone, overseer of detention operations for the US military in Iraq at the time. During his imprisonment he exercised and was allowed to have his personal garden, he also smoked his cigars and wrote his diary in the courtyard of his cell.

Trial 

On 30 June 2004, Saddam Hussein, held in custody by US forces at the US base "Camp Cropper," along with 11 other senior Ba'athist leaders, were handed over to the interim Iraqi government to stand trial for crimes against humanity and other offences.

A few weeks later, he was charged by the Iraqi Special Tribunal with crimes committed against residents of Dujail in 1982, following a failed assassination attempt against him. Specific charges included the murder of 148 people, torture of women and children and the illegal arrest of 399 others.
Among the many challenges of the trial were:
 Saddam and his lawyers contesting the court's authority and maintaining that he was still the President of Iraq.
 The assassinations and attempted assassinations of several of Saddam's lawyers.
 The replacement of the chief presiding judge midway through the trial.

On 5 November 2006, Saddam was found guilty of crimes against humanity and sentenced to death by hanging. Saddam's half-brother, Barzan Ibrahim, and Awad Hamed al-Bandar, head of Iraq's Revolutionary Court in 1982, were convicted of similar charges. The verdict and sentencing were both appealed, but subsequently affirmed by Iraq's Supreme Court of Appeals.

Execution 

Saddam was hanged on the first day of Eid ul-Adha, 30 December 2006, despite his wish to be executed by firing squad (which he argued was the lawful military capital punishment, citing his military position as the commander-in-chief of the Iraqi military). The execution was carried out at Camp Justice, an Iraqi army base in Kadhimiya, a neighborhood of northeast Baghdad.

Saudi Arabia condemned Iraqi authorities for carrying on with the execution on a holy day. A presenter from the Al-Ikhbariya television station officially stated: "There is a feeling of surprise and disapproval that the verdict has been applied during the holy months and the first days of Eid al-Adha. Leaders of Islamic countries should show respect for this blessed occasion ... not demean it."

Video of the execution was recorded on a mobile phone and his captors could be heard insulting Saddam. The video was leaked to electronic media and posted on the Internet within hours, becoming the subject of global controversy. It was later claimed by the head guard at the tomb where his remains lay that Saddam's body had been stabbed six times after the execution. Saddam's demeanor while being led to the gallows has been discussed by two witnesses, Iraqi Judge Munir Haddad and Iraqi national security adviser Mowaffak al-Rubaie. The accounts of the two witnesses are contradictory as Haddad describes Saddam as being strong in his final moments whereas al-Rubaie says Saddam was clearly afraid.

Saddam's last words during the execution, "May God’s blessings be upon Muhammad and his household. And may God hasten their appearance and curse their enemies." Then one of the crowd repeatedly said the name of the Iraqi Shiite cleric, Moqtada Al-Sadr. Saddam laughed and later said, "Do you consider this manhood?" The crowd shouted, "go to Hell." Saddam replied, "To the hell that is Iraq!?"  Again, one of the crowd asked those who shouted to keep quiet for God. Saddam Hussein started recitation of final Muslim prayers, "I bear witness that there is no god but Allah and I testify that Muhammad is the Messenger of Allah." One of the crowd shouted, "The tyrant [dictator] has collapsed!" Saddam said, "May God’s blessings be upon Muhammad and his household (family)". He recited the shahada one and a half times, as while he was about to say ‘Muhammad’ on the second shahada, the trapdoor opened, cutting him off mid-sentence. The rope broke his neck, killing him instantly.

Not long before the execution, Saddam's lawyers released his last letter.

A second unofficial video, apparently showing Saddam's body on a trolley, emerged several days later. It sparked speculation that the execution was carried out incorrectly as Saddam Hussein had a gaping hole in his neck.

Saddam was buried at his birthplace of Al-Awja in Tikrit, Iraq, on 31 December 2006. He was buried 3 km (2 mi) from his sons Uday and Qusay Hussein. His tomb was reported to have been destroyed in March 2015. Before it was destroyed, a Sunni tribal group reportedly removed his body to a secret location, fearful of what might happen.

Marriage and family relationships 

 Saddam married his first wife and cousin Sajida Talfah (or Tulfah/Tilfah) in 1963 in an arranged marriage. Sajida is the daughter of Khairallah Talfah, Saddam's uncle and mentor; the two were raised as brother and sister. Their marriage was arranged for Saddam at age five when Sajida was seven. They became engaged in Egypt during his exile, and married in Iraq after Saddam's 1963 return. The couple had five children.
 Uday Hussein (1964–2003), was Saddam's older son, who ran the Iraqi Football Association, Fedayeen Saddam, and several media corporations in Iraq including Iraqi TV and the newspaper Babel. Uday, while originally Saddam's favorite son and likely successor, eventually fell out of favor with his father due to his erratic behavior; he was responsible for many car crashes and rapes around Baghdad, constant feuds with other members of his family, and killing his father's favorite valet and food taster Kamel Hana Gegeo at a party in Egypt honoring Egyptian first lady Suzanne Mubarak. He became well known in the west for his involvement in looting Kuwait during the Gulf War, allegedly taking millions of dollars worth of gold, cars, and medical supplies (which were in short supply at the time) for himself and close supporters. He was widely known for his paranoia and his obsession with torturing people who disappointed him in any way, which included tardy girlfriends, friends who disagreed with him and, most notoriously, Iraqi athletes who performed poorly. He was briefly married to Izzat Ibrahim ad-Douri's daughter, but later divorced her. The couple had no children.
 Qusay Hussein (1966–2003), was Saddam's second—and, after the mid-1990s, his favorite—son. Qusay was believed to have been Saddam's later intended successor, as he was less erratic than his older brother and kept a low profile. He was second in command of the military (behind his father) and ran the elite Iraqi Republican Guard and the SSO. He was believed to have ordered the army to kill thousands of rebelling Marsh Arabs and was instrumental in suppressing Shi'ite rebellions in the mid-1990s. He was married once and had three children.
 Raghad Hussein (b. 1968) is Saddam's oldest daughter. After the 2003 invasion of Iraq, Raghad fled to Amman, Jordan where she received sanctuary from the royal family. She is currently wanted by the Iraqi Government for allegedly financing and supporting the insurgency of the now banned Iraqi Ba'ath Party. The Jordanian royal family refused to hand her over. She was married to Hussein Kamel al-Majid and has had five children from this marriage.
 Rana Hussein (b. 1969), is Saddam's second daughter. She, like her sister, fled to Jordan and has stood up for her father's rights. She was married to Saddam Kamel and has had four children from this marriage.
 Hala Hussein (b. 1972), is Saddam's third and youngest daughter. Very little information is known about her. Her father arranged for her to marry General Kamal Mustafa Abdallah Sultan al-Tikriti in 1998. She fled with her children and sisters to Jordan. In June 2021, an Iraqi court ordered the release of her husband after 18 years in prison.
 Saddam married his second wife, Samira Shahbandar, in 1986. She was originally the wife of an Iraqi Airways executive, but later became the mistress of Saddam. Eventually, Saddam forced Samira's husband to divorce her so he could marry her. After the war, Samira fled to Beirut, Lebanon. She is believed to have been the mother of Saddam's sixth child. Members of Saddam's family have denied this.

 Saddam had allegedly married a third wife, Nidal al-Hamdani, the general manager of the Solar Energy Research Center in the Council of Scientific Research.
 Wafa Mullah Huwaysh is rumored to have married Saddam as his fourth wife in 2002. There is no firm evidence for this marriage. Wafa is the daughter of Abd al-Tawab Mullah Huwaysh, a former minister of military industry in Iraq and Saddam's last deputy Prime Minister.

In August 1995, Raghad and her husband, Hussein Kamel al-Majid, and Rana and her husband, Saddam Kamel al-Majid, defected to Jordan, taking their children with them. They returned to Iraq when they received assurances that Saddam would pardon them. Within three days of their return in February 1996, both of the Kamel brothers were attacked and killed in a gunfight with other clan members who considered them traitors.

In August 2003, Saddam's daughters Raghad and Rana received sanctuary in Amman, Jordan, where they are currently staying with their nine children. That month, they spoke with CNN and the Arab satellite station Al-Arabiya in Amman. When asked about her father, Raghad told CNN, "He was a very good father, loving, has a big heart." Asked if she wanted to give a message to her father, she said: "I love you and I miss you." Her sister Rana also remarked, "He had so many feelings and he was very tender with all of us."

In 2003 (before the Iraq War), the CIA considered making a video of Saddam Hussein having sex with a male teenager to discredit Hussein with his supporters.

Philanthropy

Detroit, Michigan 
In 1979, Jacob Yasso of Sacred Heart Chaldean Church in Detroit congratulated Saddam Hussein on his presidency. In return, Yasso said that Saddam Hussein donated US$250,000 to his church, which is made up of at least 1,200 families of Middle Eastern descent. In 1980, Detroit Mayor Coleman Young allowed Yasso to present the key to the city of Detroit to Saddam Hussein. At the time, Saddam then asked Yasso, "I heard there was a debt on your church. How much is it?" After the inquiry, Saddam then donated another $200,000 to Chaldean Sacred Heart Church. Yasso said that Saddam made donations to Chaldean churches all over the world, and even went on record as saying "He's very kind to Christians."

List of government and party positions held 
 Head of Iraqi Intelligence Service (1963)
 Vice President of the Republic of Iraq (1968–1979)
 President of the Republic of Iraq (1979–2003)
 Prime Minister of the Republic of Iraq (1979–1991 and 1994–2003)
 Head of the Iraqi Revolutionary Command Council (1979–2003)
 Secretary of the Regional Command (1979–2006)
 Secretary General of the National Command (1989–2006)
 Assistant Secretary of the Regional Command (1966–1979)
 Assistant Secretary General of the National Command (1979–1989)

See also 

 Baghdad International Airport (formerly Saddam International Airport)
 House of Saddam
 Iraqi biological weapons program
 Iraq and weapons of mass destruction
 Iraqi chemical weapons program
 Leadership analysis § Saddam Hussein
 Montana Management
 Operation Rockingham
 Operation Opera
 Saddam Beach, a fishing village in India named after Saddam Hussein, in an act of solidarity during the 1991 Gulf War
 Saddam Hussein (South Park) – A fictionalized version of Saddam in South Park
 Saddam Hussein Nagar, Sri Lanka
 Saddam Hussein's novels
US list of most-wanted Iraqis
Most-wanted Iraqi playing cards

Notes

References

Further reading 
 Al-Ani, Dr. Abdul-Haq. The Trial of Saddam Hussein. . Clarity Press. 2008.
 Ashton, Nigel John et al. The Iran-Iraq War: New International Perspectives. . Routledge. 2013.
 Balaghi, Shiva. Saddam Hussein: A Biography. . Greenwich Press. 2008.
 Baram, Amatzia. Saddam Husayn and Islam, 1968–2003: Ba'thi Iraq from Secularism to Faith. . Woodrow Wilson Center Press/Johns Hopkins University Press. 2014.
 Bozo, Frédéric. A History of the Iraq Crisis: France, the United States, and Iraq, 1991–2003 (Columbia University Press, 2016). xviii, 381 pp.
 Braut-Hegghammer, Målfrid. 2020. "Cheater's Dilemma: Iraq, Weapons of Mass Destruction, and the Path to War." International Security.
 Faust, Aaron M. The Ba'thification of Iraq: Saddam Hussein's Totalitarianism. . University of Texas Press. 2015.
 Gibson, Bryan R. Sold Out? US Foreign Policy, Iraq, the Kurds, and the Cold War. . Palgrave Macmillan. 2015.
 Karsh, Efraim and Inari Rautsi. Saddam Hussein: A Political Biography. . Grove Press. 2002.
 MacKey, Sandra. The Reckoning: Iraq and the Legacy of Saddam Hussein. . W. W. Norton & Company. 2003.
 Makiya, Kanan. Republic of Fear: The Politics of Modern Iraq (Updated Edition). . University of California Press. 1998.
 
 Newton, Michael A. and Michael P. Scharf. Enemy of the State: The Trial and Execution of Saddam Hussein. . St. Martin's Press. 2008.
 Sassoon, Joseph. Saddam Hussein's Ba'th Party: Inside an Authoritarian Regime. . Cambridge University Press. 2011.

External links 

  (2000–2003)
 Saddam Hussein Profile by BBC News
 The Saddam Hussein Sourcebook  (National Security Archive at The George Washington University)
 Saddam Hussein and the Iran–Iraq War from the Dean Peter Krogh Foreign Affairs Digital Archives
 Federal Bureau of Investigation Records: The Vault – Saddam Hussein (226 pages)

|-

|-

|-

 
1937 births
2006 deaths
20th-century Iraqi novelists
20th-century Iraqi politicians
21st-century executions by Iraq
21st-century Iraqi novelists
21st-century Iraqi politicians
Anti-Americanism
Anti-Iranian sentiments
Anti-Zionism in Iraq
Saddam
Arabic-language novelists
Articles containing video clips
Burials in Iraq
Cairo University alumni
Capital punishment in Iraq
Executed Iraqi people
Executed mass murderers
Executed presidents
Filmed executions in Iraq
Fugitives
Genocide perpetrators
Heads of government convicted of war crimes
Heads of government who were later imprisoned
Heads of state convicted of war crimes
Iraqi Arab nationalists
Iraqi mass murderers
Iraqi people convicted of crimes against humanity
Iraqi people convicted of murder
Iraqi politicians convicted of crimes
Iraqi Sunni Muslims
Iraq War prisoners of war
Iraqi prisoners of war
Male novelists
Members of the National Command of the Ba'ath Party (Iraqi-dominated faction)
Members of the Regional Command of the Arab Socialist Ba'ath Party – Iraq Region
Most-wanted Iraqi playing cards
People convicted of murder by Iraq
People executed for crimes against humanity
People executed by Iraq by hanging
People from Tikrit
People of the 1991 uprisings in Iraq
Politicide perpetrators
Presidents of Iraq
Prime Ministers of Iraq
Vice presidents of Iraq
Tulfah family